Norwegian Getaway is a cruise ship of the Norwegian Cruise Line. It was built by Meyer Werft in Papenburg, Germany, and was delivered to its owner on 10 January 2014. At the time of its christening it was the world's ninth-largest cruise ship with a passenger capacity of 3,969 and a crew of 1,640.

Amenities on board the ship include restaurants by chef Geoffrey Zakarian, an entertainment venue devoted to magic called the "Illusionarium", and another entertainment venue themed in conjunction with the Grammy Awards. The ship is based in Miami and mostly sails seven-night Eastern Caribbean cruises. It was christened in Miami on 7 February 2014, with the Miami Dolphins Cheerleaders serving as godmothers. The ship departed on its maiden voyage the next day.

Design and description
The name of the ship was selected in a competition, and was submitted by Dennis Hultman of Vienna, Virginia, United States. NCL expected the ship to be based out of Miami year-round. David "LEBO" Le Batard was commissioned by NCL to design the mural on the hull of the ship.

A fire broke out at the shipyard on 5 March 2013, but no one was injured and it did not delay the delivery of the vessel. Smoke from the fire did result in production areas and the visitors center being evacuated.

The cruise line and the U.S. Coast Guard commenced a search. The next day, a steward on another cruise ship, spotted the crew member in the ocean. He had been treading water for almost 22 hours when he was rescued, alive and well.

Entertainment
Entertainment on board the ship includes the "Illusionarium", an entertainment venue devoted to magic and illusion performances. It also includes a -high video dome in the middle of the performance area. The water park has five slides, including two freefall drop and two twister slides located side by side in a spiral and one kids slide.

There is a Grammy entertainment venue which includes items taken from the Grammy Museum at L.A. Live in Los Angeles. In line with this, Norwegian Cruise Line became the "Official Cruise Line Partner of the Grammy Awards".

Restaurants 

Chef Geoffrey Zakarian has food venues on board the ship including the Ocean Blue concept. Ocean Blue forms part of the area on the ship called "The Waterfront" which allows for outdoor dining in most of the restaurants on board.

Guest Services

Itineraries
The vessel arrived in Southampton from Rotterdam on 14 January 2014, leaving for two crew work-up day-cruises in the English Channel on 14 and 15 January, before departing from Southampton for New York City on 16 January.

While in New York, it was temporarily rechristened the "Bud Light Hotel" to house 4,000 people during its docking at the New York Passenger Ship Terminal during the week of Super Bowl XLVIII.

In February 2014, it began to undertake cruises to the Caribbean continuing to do so in the 2015 season.

In 2017, Norwegian announced that the Norwegian Getaway will spend the summer of 2019 homeported in Copenhagen, offering nine-day cruises to Scandinavia and Russia. In the fall of 2019, the Getaway arrived New Orleans, where it offered various length cruises to the Western Caribbean. Itineraries were cancelled out of the Port of New Orleans in mid-March 2020, due to the COVID-19 pandemic. In the summer of 2020, the Norwegian Getaway began 10-/11-day cruises around the Mediterranean from its summer homeport in Civitavecchia, calling at ports in the Greek Isles, Italy, and various other ports in the Western and Eastern Mediterranean.

References

External links

Official website

Ships built in Papenburg
Ships of Norwegian Cruise Line
2013 ships